Lascoria arenosa is a species of litter moth of the family Erebidae first described by William Schaus in 1916. It is found in South America, including Suriname.

References

Herminiinae
Moths described in 1916